The Széchenyi István University (SZE), also known as the University of Győr, is located in Győr and Mosonmagyaróvár, Hungary. The university was established in 1968. 

In cooperation with Audi Hungaria Motor Kft, one of the University’s greatest strengths is in the field of automotive engineering.

History 

In 1963 the government made a resolution to establish an architectural university. In 1968 the resolution was changed and the government wished to build a telecommunication university. The university’s predecessor in title, the Transportation and Telecommunication Faculty of Technical Sciences, was established in this year.  The faculty trained engineers for the transportation and telecommunication infrastructure. The building of the university was built—an unmatched exception in Hungary, originally for education purposes—on the picturesque bend of the Moson Danube within walking distance of the baroque city. 

In the early 1990s beyond the technical sciences, economical, medical and social programmes became in demand. In 1995 the Eötvös Loránd University set up a law programme here, so the juridical training returned to the city and, since 2002, it is its own programme at Széchenyi István University.

The institution bears the name of István Széchenyi the "greatest Hungarian" since 1986. The university offers several courses in BA/BSc and MA/MSc and doctoral schools are available.

Organization 
The university provides education at 9 faculties and 4 doctoral schools:

Faculties

 Apáczai Csere János Faculty of Humanities, Education and Social Sciences
 Audi Hungaria Faculty of Automotive Engineering
 Deák Ferenc Faculty of Law and Political Sciences
 Faculty of Agricultural and Food Sciences (its legal predecessor was established in 1818, the faculty joined the university in 2016)
 Faculty of Architecture, Civil Engineering and Transport Sciences
 Faculty of Art
 Faculty of Health and Sport Sciences
 Faculty of Mechanical Engineering, Informatics and Electrical Engineering
 Kautz Gyula Faculty of Economics

Doctoral Schools

 Doctoral School of Law and Political Sciences
 Doctoral School of Multidisciplinary Engineering Sciences 
 Doctoral School of Regional- and Economic Sciences
 Wittmann Antal Multidisciplinary Doctoral School of. Plant, Animal and Food Sciences

Developments 

In May 2008, the new architectural studio was opened. It was converted from an old transformation house. Széchényi István University won on the calling for tender to improve public facilities. The university has several projects underway including AUTOPOLIS: The construction of a new building will expand the capacity of the university and will serve for research and development purposes. Within this project a foot-bridge will be re-located and two multi-storey car parks will be built. The project is estimated to be finished in 2011.

Student life 
There are several opportunities for entertainment in Győr and at the university. Every year there is a Széchenyi-week, where famous Hungarian people (writers, comedians, etc.) are invited. The university offers opportunities to do sport (rowing, soccer, swimming etc.). The Széchenyi race takes stage during Széchenyi-week. Alternative-operated vehicles challenge each other at the parking lot in front of the university.

Notes

References 
 dr. Fekete Mátyás: Győr-Moson-Sopron megye kézikönyve (Szekszárd 1998)  Ö; 
 http://info.sze.hu/

External links 
 uni.sze.hu
 http://info.sze.hu/ (English information site of the university)
 New website in English

Széchenyi István University
Buildings and structures in Győr
Buildings and structures in Győr-Moson-Sopron County
Education in Győr-Moson-Sopron County
Educational institutions established in 1968
1968 establishments in Hungary